

Map 

The map data are for the year 2014 from the World Bank. Numbers are in percentage.

Table 

The table data are for the year 2017 from the World Bank. Numbers are in percentage.

See also

Plotted maps
European countries by electricity consumption per person
European countries by employment in agriculture (% of employed)
European countries by fossil fuel use (% of total energy)
European countries by health expense per person
European countries by military expenditure as a percentage of government expenditure
European countries by percentage of urban population
European countries by percentage of women in national parliaments
List of sovereign states in Europe by life expectancy
List of sovereign states in Europe by number of Internet users

References

External links 

Population 0-14
Youth in Europe